Hamish and Andy's “Perfect”    Holiday is a comedy miniseries following Australian comedians Hamish Blake and Andy Lee, on their trips to various international locations in an attempt to find the "perfect holiday". The series premiered on 17 November 2019.

The series made its streaming debut on Stan in June 2022, alongside the duo’s previous series True Story with Hamish & Andy.

Format

Hamish and Andy will travel across United States, Alaska and Canada in 17 days to create their “Perfect Holiday”, however their activities on their adventure are decided by one for the other which will end in idiotic, extraordinary and dangerous results.

Episodes

See also
 Hamish and Andy's Gap Year
 Caravan of Courage

References

External links
 Hamish and Andy
 Nine Network

2019 Australian television series debuts
Australian comedy television series
English-language television shows
Nine Network original programming
Hamish & Andy